NGC 3412 is a barred lenticular galaxy located in the constellation Leo. It was discovered on April 8, 1784 by the astronomer William Herschel.

References

External links 
 

Leo (constellation)
3412
Barred lenticular galaxies
032508